Sardar Muhammad Yousuf became the minister for Religious Affairs and Interfaith Harmony, in the Abbasi cabinet from August 2017 to May 2018. A leader of the Pakistan Muslim League (Nawaz), Sardar Muhammad Yousuf had been a member of the National Assembly of Pakistan when he had an alliance  with Shahzada Muhammad Gushtasip Khan which he then broke from 1990 to 1999 and again from June 2013 to May 2018. He previously served as Minister for Religious Affairs and Interfaith Harmony in the third Sharif ministry from 2013 to 2017. He also served as a member of the Provincial Assembly of Khyber Pakhtunkhwa from August 2018 to January 2023.

Political career 

Yousuf was elected to the Provincial Assembly of Khyber Pakhtunkhwa for the first time in 1985 Pakistani general election.

He ran for the seat of the Provincial Assembly of Khyber Pakhtunkhwa as an independent candidate from Constituency PF-45 (Mansehra-IV) in 1988 Pakistani general election, but was unsuccessful. He received 9,811 votes and lost the seat to an independent candidate, Faiz Muhammad Khan. In the same election, he ran for the seat of the National Assembly of Pakistan from Constituency NA-16 (Mansehra-III) as a candidate of Pakistan Peoples Party but was unsuccessful.

He was re-elected to the Provincial Assembly of Khyber Pakhtunkhwa as an independent candidate from Constituency PF-45 (Mansehra-IV) in 1990 Pakistani general election and defeated Faiz Muhammad Khan. In the same election, he was elected to the National Assembly as an independent candidate from Constituency NA-14 (Mansehra-I). He received 34,787 votes and defeated a candidate of Jamiat Ulema-e Islam (F) (JUI-F). After winning he joined Pakistan Muslim League (N) (PML-N).

He ran for the seat of the Provincial Assembly of Khyber Pakhtunkhwa as an independent candidate from Constituency PF-45 (Mansehra-IV) in 1993 Pakistani general election, but was unsuccessful. He received 486 votes and lost the seat to an independent candidate, Haq Nawaz Khan. In the same election, he was re-elected to the National Assembly as a candidate of PML-N from Constituency NA-14 (Mansehra-I). He received 58,191 votes and defeated a candidate of Pakistan Muslim League (J).

He was elected to the National Assembly as a candidate of PML-N from Constituency NA-14 (Mansehra-I) in 1997 Pakistani general election. He received 46,918 votes and defeated a candidate of JUI-F.

He served as District Nazim of Mansehra District.

He left PML-N to join Pakistan Muslim League (Q) (PML-Q) after 1999 Pakistani coup d'état.

He could not run in the 2002 Pakistani general election and again in 2008 Pakistani general election because of the graduation degree bar.

In early 2013, he left PML-Q to join the PML-N.

He was re-elected to the National Assembly as a candidate of PML-N from Constituency NA-20 (Mansehra-I) in the 2013 Pakistani general election. Upon PML-N victory in the Pakistani general election, 2013, he was appointed Minister for Religious Affair and Interfaith Harmony in the third Sharif ministry.

He had ceased to hold ministerial office in July 2017 when the federal cabinet was disbanded following the resignation of Prime Minister Nawaz Sharif after Panama Papers case decision. Following the election of Shahid Khaqan Abbasi as Prime Minister of Pakistan, Yousaf was inducted into the federal cabinet of Abbasi and was appointed Minister for Religious Affairs for the second time. Upon the dissolution of the National Assembly on the expiration of its term on 31 May 2018, Yousuf ceased to hold the office as Federal Minister for Religious Affairs and Interfaith Harmony.

He was re-elected to Provincial Assembly of Khyber Pakhtunkhwa as a candidate of PML-N from Constituency PK-34 (Mansehra-V) in 2018 Pakistani general election.

References

Mayors of places in Pakistan
Hindkowan people
People from Mansehra District
Living people
Pakistani MNAs 2013–2018
Pakistan Muslim League (N) MPAs (Khyber Pakhtunkhwa)
Year of birth missing (living people)
Pakistani MNAs 1990–1993
Pakistani MNAs 1997–1999
Pakistani MNAs 1993–1996
Religious Ministers of Pakistan
Khyber Pakhtunkhwa MPAs 2018–2023
Pakistani Muslims